Da kine is an expression in Hawaiian Pidgin (Hawaii Creole English), probably derived from "that kind", that usually functions grammatically as a placeholder name (compare to English "whatsit" and "whatchamacallit"). It can also take the role of a verb, adjective, or adverb.  Unlike other placeholder names in English, however, which usually refer specifically to a device ("gizmo" or "widget"), person ("so-and-so"), or place ("Anytown, USA"), "da kine" is general in usage and could refer to anything from a person to an abstract concept.  It can be used to refer to something nonspecific, or given enough context (especially when used in conversation between native speakers of the dialect) to something very specific.  As such, it appears to be unique among English dialects, at least in its centrality to everyday speech.

"Da kine" is probably the most identifying characteristic of spoken Hawaiian Pidgin, and certainly the most versatile.
The humorous illustrated dictionary Pidgin to Da Max defines "da kine" as:
"the keystone of pidgin. You can use it anywhere, anytime, anyhow. Very convenient."
A surfing dictionary lists da kine as "the word you use when you don't use the word."

"Da kine" is used as shorthand when it is likely the listener will understand what is meant from context or a combination of context and body language. One definition (in mixed Pidgin) is: "Can have any kine connotation depends on how you say um and who you say um wit."

"Da kine" may be related to the word "kine", which is used variously as an intensifier, short for "kind of" in the sense of "type of", and for many other purposes (perhaps almost as much variety as "da kine").  However, it may not be entirely accurate to analyze it as a phrase consisting of "da" (the Pidgin definite article) and "kine", as "kine" by itself does not have the same meaning.  One possible analysis is that "da" in "da kine" is a clitic, as phrases such as "da odda kine" (other kind) or "all kine" (all kinds) are commonly used.

The simplest explanation of its origin comes from the simple context of its use.  "Da Kine" comes from "the kind" or "the thing" and is used as an extremely vague, yet simple explanation of an action or object when something's specific name is unknown or cannot come to mind.  (I talked on my 'da kine' = I talked on 'the thing you use to talk to people' = I talked on my 'phone') (I wen fo one da kine las night = I went for a 'the thing you do when you move your legs' last night = I went for a 'run' last night)  A pidgin speaker who uses "da kine" for its true purpose (not local slang) will often repeat "da kine" several times and attempt to explain what it is to fully get the idea across.

In popular culture
While "da kine" appears in many contexts and refers to almost anything, it is frequently associated with something good or genuine—"the best"-for example, as a company name.

"Da kine" appears in the titles of books, often calling Hawaiian Pidgin itself "Da Kine Talk".

DaKine, founded in 1979, is an outdoor apparel company specializing in sportswear and equipment for alternative sports.

Da Kine Bail Bonds is a Honolulu, Hawaii-based bail bonds company owned by Duane "Dog" Chapman, the title character in the A&E reality TV series Dog the Bounty Hunter.

"Da Kine" is cited as the callsign meaning of KINE-FM 105.1, a Honolulu-based Hawaiian music radio station.

See also
Pragmatics
Skookum, similar term used in the Cascadia region of the Northwest US/western Canada

References

Hawaiian Pidgin
Placeholder names